The repechage round held in 2019 will provide the final opportunity to qualify for the 2021 Rugby League World Cup. 3 nations participated; the 2018 Americas Championship runner-up (the United States), 7th highest ranked Asia/Pacific nation (the Cook Islands), and the 2nd highest ranked Middle-East/African nation (South Africa).

Bracket

Fixtures

References

2021 Rugby League World Cup
2019 in rugby league
Rugby league in Sydney